Patricia Heights is a neighbourhood in west Edmonton, Alberta, Canada. It is bounded by the Patricia Ravine of the North Saskatchewan River valley and ravine system to the south and southwest, the Westridge neighbourhood to the west, the Elmwood and Lynnwood neighbourhoods across Whitemud Drive to the north, and the Rio Terrace neighbourhood across 156 Street to the east.

The community is represented by the Rio Terrace Community League, established in 1960, which maintains a community hall, outdoor rink and tennis courts located at 155 Street and 76 Avenue.

History 
Approximately 59% of the homes in Patricia Heights were built during the 1960s with 28% being built in the 1970s.

Demographics 

Transportation 
Vehicle access to Patricia Heights is limited to the 159 Street interchange along Whitemud Drive and the 156 Street overpass over Whitemud Drive.

The Edmonton Transit Service provides bus service to the neighbourhood via 159 Street and 156 Street from the north.

Pedestrian access to the neighbourhood is available by a trail from Westridge through the Patricia Ravine to the southwest and from Elmwood via a pedestrian bridge over the Whitemud Drive.

Services 
The Patricia Heights Shopping Centre, a strip mall, is located in the neighbourhood on the west side of 156 Street.

Education 
The Patricia Heights Elementary School, operated by Edmonton Public Schools, is located within the neighbourhood.

Facilities 
The Jewish Community Centre of Edmonton was located in the southeast corner of the neighbourhood on the west side of 156 Street, overlooking the confluence of the Patricia Ravine and the North Saskatchewan River valley.

Housing 
In 2005, 310 or 46% of the dwelling units in Patricia Heights were single-family dwellings, while 365 or 54% were low-rise apartments (fewer than five storeys). Of the 675 total dwelling units, 357 or 53% were occupied by renters in 2005.

Surrounding neighbourhoods

See also 
 Edmonton Federation of Community Leagues

References 

Neighbourhoods in Edmonton